

Storms
Note:  indicates the name was retired after that usage in the respective basin

Vae (1952) – Category 1 typhoon, struck Vietnam then crossed over to the North Indian Ocean before dissipating

Vaianu (2006) – Category 1-equivalent cyclone, caused minor damage in Tonga

Val
1975 – Category 4 tropical cyclone, meandered near Fiji and Wallis and Futuna
1980 – passed over Wallis and Futuna
1982 – short-lived storm east of Taiwan; also known as Deling within the Philippine Area of Responsibility (PAR), and also considered a continuation of Tess by the Japan Meteorological Agency (JMA)
1985 – passed south of Taiwan, dissipated approaching Guangdong; also known as Narsing within the PAR
1988 – late season storm, dissipated northeast of the Philippines; also known as Apiang within the PAR
1991 – Category 4 tropical cyclone, caused over US$250 million in damage in Samoa and American Samoa
1992 – remained east of Japan
1995 – took erratic track southeast of Japan before dissipating northeast of the Philippines

Vamco
2003 – hit Zhejiang in eastern China; also known as Manang within the PAR
2009 – Category 4-equivalent typhoon, churned in the open ocean
2015 – affected Indochina, killing 15 people
2020 – powerful and deadly Category 4-equivalent Typhoon, made landfall on Luzon and in Vietnam; also known as Ulysses within the PAR

Valerie (1962) – Category 1 hurricane, struck western Mexico

Vanessa
1976 – Category 3 tropical cyclone, meandered off the northwest coast of Australia
1981 – remained well east of Japan
1984 – Category 5 super typhoon, killed 64 people in the Philippines, despite remaining well east of the country; also known as Toyang within the PAR
1988 – moved across the Philippines then struck southeastern China; also known as Edeng within the PAR
1991 – moved across the Philippines then dissipated in the South China Sea; also known as Bebeng within the PAR
1994 – short-lived storm, absorbed by the larger Typhoon Tim off the west coast of Luzon; also known as Loleng within the PAR

Vance
1990 – Category 2 Hurricane, made a clockwise loop looped off the southwest coast of Mexico
1999 – Category 4 tropical cyclone, caused severe damage across the western coast of Australia
2014 – Category 2 hurricane, weakened as it curved back toward the coast of Mexico

Vania
1994 – moved over several islands of Vanuatu
2011 – affected Fiji, Vanuatu, New Caledonia, Norfolk Island and New Zealand

Vardah (2016) – struck the Andaman and Nicobar Islands along with South India

Vaughn (2000) – Category 2 tropical cyclone, dissipated as it approached the coast of Queensland

Vayu (2019) – Category 3-equivalent tropical cyclone, struck the Saurashtra Peninsula of northwestern India

Veena (1983) – Category 3-equivalent tropical cyclone, moved through French Polynesia

Veli
1987 – affected Vanuatu; interacted with and absorbed Cyclone Uma
1998 – Category 1 tropical cyclone, caused minor damaging surf on the islands of French Polynesia

Velma (1983) – short-lived tropical storm off the southwestern coast of Mexico

Vera
1951 – tropical storm, remained east of Japan
1956 – Category 1 typhoon, struck the Philippines, Hainan, and Vietnam
1959 – deadly Category 5 super typhoon, struck Japan, killing around 5,000 people
1962 – Category 1-equivalent typhoon, passed northwest of Okinawa before making landfall near Kagoshima
1965 – short-lived tropical storm that struck the eastern Philippines; also known as Daling within the PAR
1967 – tropical storm, remained east of Japan
1971 – minimal typhoon, remained away from land; also known as Karing within the PAR
1973 – moved across southern Philippines; also known as Openg within the PAR
1974 – developed east of Australia and progressed southeastward
1977 – Category 3 typhoon, rapidly intensified prior to striking Taiwan and eastern China; also known as Huling within the PAR
1979 – Category 5 super typhoon, weakened before hitting Luzon; also known as Yayang within the PAR
1983 – Category 2 typhoon, crossed the Philippines and Hainan, killing 127 people; also known as Bebeng within the PAR
1986 – Category 3 typhoon, took an erratic track before hitting South Korea, killing 25 people; also known as Loleng within the PAR
1989 – struck Zhejiang in eastern China, killing 500 people; also known as Pining within the PAR

Vern (1978) – Category 2 tropical cyclone, hit Western Australia

Verna
1945 – tropical storm, moved across Hainan island
1977 – made landfall near Bowen, Queensland
Verne
1991 – passed north of Guam
1994 – Category 4 typhoon, passed near Guam, stalled as it approached the Philippines, then moved out to sea; also known as Delang in the PAR

Vernon
1980 – Category 3 typhoon, remained east of Japan
1984 – caused flooding in Vietnam
1986 – developed and dissipated northeast of Australia
1987 – passed northeast of Luzon and later struck Taiwan; also known as Diding in the PAR
1990 – Category 2 typhoon, remained east of Japan
1993 – Category 1 typhoon, paralleled the east coast of Japan
2022 – Category 3 tropical cyclone, remained over the open Indian Ocean

Veronica (2019) – Category 5 severe tropical cyclone, hit Western Australia causing about 1.7 billion (1.2 billion) in economic losses

Vicente
2005 – caused severe flooding in Vietnam and Thailand
2012 – Category 4 typhoon, struck the Chinese province of Guangdong; also known as Ferdie within the PAR
2018 – small tropical storm, made landfall in the Mexican State of Michoacán

Vicky
1972 – Category 2 tropical cyclone, crossed Western Australia coast at Cockatoo Island
2001 – short-lived storm, remained over the open South Pacific Ocean
February 2020 – short-lived storm, tracked near Samoa then passed just south of Tutuila in American Samoa
September 2020 – storm churned in the eastern Atlantic Ocean
December 2020 –  caused deadly flooding in the Philippines; also known as Krovanh beyond the PAR

Victor
1986 – Category 3 tropical  cyclone, parallelled the coast of Western Australia
1997 – killed 655 people when it struck the Chinese province of Guangdong; also known as Goring within the PAR
1998 – formed from the remnants of Cyclone Katrina, moved through the Northern Territory and into the Indian Ocean, becoming a Category 2 tropical cyclone; renamed Cindy upon entering the South-West Indian Ocean
2016 – Category 2 tropical cyclone, formed east of Pago Pago, American Samoa
 2021 – large tropical storm, formed south of Cabo Verde and moved over the open Atlantic Ocean

Victoria
1965 – developed off the southwest coast of Mexico
2013 – Category 3 severe tropical cyclone on the Australian Scale, remained well west of Australia

Vida (1975) – Category 2 tropical cyclone, paralleled the coast of Western Australia, buffeted the Perth metropolitan region area with high winds

Vince
2005 – Category 1 hurricane, formed southeast of the Azores and made landfall on the Iberian Peninsula as a tropical depression
2011 – poorly organized storm, formed and dissipated northwest of Western Australia

Vincent
1990 – paralleled the coast of Western Australia
2001 – made landfall in Western Australia as a tropical low

Vinta
2009 – Category 5 super typhoon, the most intense tropical cyclone worldwide in 2009, remained over the open Pacific Ocean; also known as Nida beyond the PAR
2013 – Category 3 typhoon, struck Luzon and affected Vietnam; also known as Krosa beyond the PAR
2017 – Category 2 typhoon, struck Mindanao killing 266 people; also known as Tembin beyond the PAR

Viola
1953 – Category 3 typhoon, passed south of Taiwan
1958 – Category 3 typhoon, brushed Guam and remained east of Japan
1961 – short-lived storm near southern Vietnam
1964 – Category 1-equivalent typhoon, struck near Hong Kong; also known as Konsing within the PAR
1966 – severe tropical storm, caused minor damage in Japan
1969 – Category 4 typhoon, caused 1,000 deaths in Guangdong, China; also known as Elang within the PAR
1972 – classified as a tropical storm by the JTWC, stayed far east of Japan; also known as Esang within the PAR
1975 – short-lived storm northeast of the Philippines; also known as Gening within the PAR
1978 – Category 4 typhoon that tracked northeast of the Philippines; also known as Esang within the PAR
1979 – Category 5 severe tropical cyclone on the Australian scale; renamed Claudette after crossing into the South-West Indian Ocean

Violet
1955 – Category 1 typhoon, struck Mindanao in the Philippines
1959 – short-lived tropical depression near southeastern Vietnam
1961 – Category 5 super typhoon, clipped the Boso Peninsula of Japan
1964 – Category 1-equivalent typhoon, struck central Vietnam
1967 – Category 4-equivalent typhoon, hit northeastern Luzon; also known as Karing within the PAR
1970 – crossed Luzon in the Philippine island of Luzon and then made landfall in Guangdong, China; also known as Heling within the PAR
1972 – severe tropical storm, remained over the open Pacific Ocean
1976 – tropical storm that killed two people when it struck Hainan and Guangdong in China; also known as Lusing within the PAR
1995 – Category 2 tropical cyclone that paralleled Australia's east
1996 – Category 4 super typhoon, brushed southeastern Japan; also known as Osang within the PAR

Violeta (2004)  – traversed the Philippines as a tropical depression, killed 31 people; also known as Merbok beyond the PAR

Vipa (2001) – Category 1 typhoon, passed southeast of Japan

Virgil
 1992 – Category 4 hurricane, weakened before landfall in the Mexican state of Colima
 1999 – severe tropical storm southeast of Japan

Virginia
1957 – Category 5 typhoon, killed 86 people and caused extensive damage in Taiwan and southern Japan
1969 – Category 2 typhoon, killed 2 people when it hit Shikoku and Honshu in Japan
1963 – moderate tropical storm that remained out to sea; also known as Etang within the PAR
1965 – minimal Category 1 typhoon, approached Japan before curving back out to sea
1968 – became a severe tropical storm just west of the International Date Line and shortly thereafter crossed into the Central Pacific Ocean
1971 – strong Category 4 typhoon, killed 56 people died in Japan due to numerous landslides
1974 – Category 1-equivalent typhoon, never affected land.
1978 – Category 1-equivalent typhoon, brushed eastern Japan

Viring (2003) – Category 1 typhoon, struck northeastern Luzon, killing four people, then passed just east of Taiwan; also known as Melor beyond the PAR

Vivian (1985) – short-lived tropical storm far to the southwest of the Baja California peninsula

Vivienne
1971 – South Pacific tropical cyclone
1984 – developed southwest of Indonesia; renamed Fanja after crossing into the South-West Indian Ocean
2005 – short-lived storm off the northwest coast of Western Australia

Viyaru (2013) – brought heavy rains to parts of Indonesia, Sri Lanka, India, Bangladesh, Myanmar and Thailand, killing 107 people; known operationally as Mahasen

Vongfong
2002 – tropical storm that struck the Chinese province of Guangdong, killing 41 people
2008 – tropical storm that passed east of Japan
2014 – Category 5 super typhoon that struck Japan; also known as Ompong within the PAR
2020 – Category 3 typhoon that hit the Philippines, causing over ₱1 billion damage; also known as Ambo within the PAR

See also
 Tropical cyclone naming
 List of historical tropical cyclone names

References

V